The 20th-Century Architecture of Frank Lloyd Wright is a UNESCO World Heritage Site consisting of a selection of eight buildings across the United States that were designed by American architect Frank Lloyd Wright. These sites demonstrate his philosophy of organic architecture, designing structures that were in harmony with humanity and its environment. Wright's work had an international influence on the development of architecture in the 20th century.

Frank Lloyd Wright

Frank Lloyd Wright (1867–1959) was raised in rural Wisconsin and studied civil engineering at the University of Wisconsin.  He then apprenticed with noted architects in the Chicago school of architecture, particularly Louis Sullivan.  Wright opened his own successful Chicago practice in 1893, and developed an influential home and studio in Oak Park, Illinois. In the 20th century, he became one of the most renowned architects in the world.

Nomination
Through efforts led by the Frank Lloyd Wright Conservancy, a non profit organization, the collection was originally put on the World Heritage Tentative List in 2008 with ten of Wright's buildings. It then grew to 11 sites in 2011, but the S. C. Johnson & Son Inc. Administration Building and Research Tower in Racine, Wisconsin, was eventually removed. A 2015 bid for inscription was referred by UNESCO for revision in July 2016. The Conservancy led, Frank Lloyd Wright World Heritage Council, worked closely with the National Park Service and UNESCO to reconsider the original proposal and to make appropriate changes.

In December 2018, a revised proposal was submitted with eight buildings, excluding the Price Tower in Bartlesville, Oklahoma, and the Marin County Civic Center in San Rafael, California, from the proposal. In the following June, the International Council on Monuments and Sites gave a positive recommendation. The site was inscribed on the World Heritage list in July 2019.

World Heritage listing
The eight representative Wright buildings selected for the World Heritage Site were designed in the first half of the 20th century.  The first building included, Unity Temple (001), was completed in 1908. The last, The Guggenheim (008), was completed in 1959—the year Wright died—although its design began in the 1940s.

References

 
Wright, Frank Lloyd
Wright, Frank Lloyd
Wright, Frank Lloyd